Camarasaurus grandis is an extinct species of sauropod dinosaur in the genus that lived during the Jurassic in what is now the western United States. It is the geologically oldest of the four species of the genus Camarasaurus.

Taxonomy

Camarasaurus grandis was named by Othniel Charles Marsh in 1877. It is one of four valid species of Camarasaurus, alongside Camarasaurus lentus, Camarasaurus lewisi, and Camarasaurus supremus. The type specimen of Camarasaurus grandis is the holotype YPM 1901, a partial skeleton of an immature individual from Como Bluff, Wyoming.

Camarasaurus grandis is regarded as having three junior synonyms: Morosaurus impar, Morosaurus robustus, and Pleurocoelus montanus.  One of these junior synonyms, M. impar, is the type species of Morosaurus, the genus to which C. grandis and C. lentus were assigned until it was synonymized with Camarasaurus. Amphicoelias latus, which is conventionally regarded as a synonym of C. supremus, may also be synonymous with C. grandis, based on where its type specimen was found. C. grandis'''s contemporary, C. lewisi, may also be synonymous with Camarasaurus grandis. The holotype of C. lentus may be a specimen of C. grandis, rather than the species conventionally known as C. lentus.

There are numerous specimens of Camarasaurus grandis, and the majority of the skeleton is known.

DescriptionCamarasaurus grandis was a moderately-sized member of its genus, similar in size to C. lentus but smaller than C. supremus.

The anterior dorsal vertebrae of Camarasaurus grandis are one of the most distinctive parts of the skeleton. The vertebrae are much taller than in C. lentus and C. supremus. The vertebrae are also unusual in the position of the connections between the neural arch and centrum, known as the neurocentral synostoses. In most reptiles, including Camarasaurus lentus, the neurocentral synostoses lie at the level of the ventral margin of the neural arch. In contrast, in C. grandis, the neurocentral synostoses are elevated above the level of the neural canal, with raised pedicels on the centrum separating the neural arch from the articular faces of the centrum. The centrum can completely surround the canal, resulting in a neural arch that does not actually form an arch over the neural canal. This characteristic is only visible in juveniles.C. grandis differs from C. lentus in having T-shaped expansions of its anterior caudal neural spines.

History of study

In 1877 during the Yale Peabody Museum’s expedition to Como Bluff, William Harlow Reed and several other field workers for Othniel Charles Marsh collected a basioccipital and partial postcranial skeleton. Camarasaurus grandis was named by Marsh in 1877 on the specimen (YPM 1901). He initially considered it a species of Apatosaurus. The next year, Marsh named another new species, Morosaurus impar, and shortly thereafter reclassified Apatosaurus grandis as Morosaurus grandis and named a third species, Morosaurus robustus. The type specimens of M. impar and M. robustus could be from the same individual as YPM 1901. Additional material of C. lentus would be collected between 1877 and 1879 by YPM crews, including some skull material. In 1896, Marsh named another species of Sauropod from Como Bluff, Pleurocoelus montanus, based on a fragmentary postcranial skeleton of a juvenile from. The species was later synonymized with C. grandis. All of the material found at Como Bluff came from the Kimmeridgian of the Morrison Formation. 

During the Second Dinosaur Rush in 1900, crews of the Field Museum of Natural History collected several appendicular and axial elements, including a nearly complete forelimb, near Fruita, Colorado. The C. grandis material from Fruita led to new reconstructions of Sauropod manus and pes structure. In 1898, Samuel Wendell Williston regarded M. impar as synonymous with M. grandis. In 1901, Elmer Riggs recognized that Morosaurus was a junior synonym of Camarasaurus. C. robustus was suggested to be synonymous with C. grandis in 1930 by Richard S. Lull. In 1958, Theodore E. White synonymized C. grandis with C. supremus. This proposed synonymy has not been upheld by subsequent study.

A specimen of Camarasaurus grandis was excavated in New Mexico in 1978, and was one of the first partial skeletons from the Morrison Formation to be excavated in the state. It was initially reported as a specimen of C. cf. supremus in 1982, but reinterpreted as C. grandis in 2005. 

A relatively complete skeleton of Camarasaurus grandis, GMNH-PV 101, was described in 1996. However, an unpublished study by Emanuel Tschopp and colleagues presented at the 2014 meeting of the Society of Vertebrate Paleontology suggested that this specimen may have closer affinities to Camarasaurus lewisi, which they argued represented a distinct genus, Cathetosaurus.

PaleoecologyCamarasaurus grandis lived during the Kimmeridgian age of the Jurassic in what is now Wyoming, Colorado, and New Mexico. It is one of the more common species of Camarasaurus, with 9.1% of known Camarasaurus specimens identified as C. grandis (the majority of specimens cannot be identified as belonging to any particular species).

A specimen of C. grandis from New Mexico showed signs of having been fed on by Allosaurus.Camarasaurus grandis is the geologically oldest species of Camarasaurus'', and may be ancestral to the later species of the genus.

References

Jurassic sauropods
Late Jurassic dinosaurs of North America
Macronarians
Dinosaurs of the Morrison Formation
Fossil taxa described in 1877
Taxa named by Othniel Charles Marsh
Paleontology in Colorado
Paleontology in New Mexico
Paleontology in Wyoming